The purpose of the International Commission for Acoustics (ICA) is to promote international development and collaboration in all fields of acoustics including research, development, education, and standardisation.

The ICA is a Scientific Associate of the International Council for Science (ICSU), an Affiliated Commission of the International Union of Pure and Applied Physics (IUPAP), and an Affiliated Organization of the International Union of Theoretical and Applied Mechanics (IUTAM).

The ICA has a membership of over 40 national acoustical societies, and has affiliate members including the European Acoustics Association (EAA), the  IberoAmerican Federation of Acoustics (FIA), the International Institute of Noise Control Engineering (I-INCE), the International Institute of Acoustics and Vibration (IIAV), the Western Pacific Acoustics Commission (WESPAC) and the International Congress on Ultrasonics (ICU).

The ICA convenes the triennial International Congresses on Acoustics, sponsors specialty symposia in acoustics, and coordinates the main international meetings within acoustics.

History 
The International Commission on Acoustics (ICA) was instituted in 1951 as a subcommittee to the International Union of Pure and Applied Physics (IUPAP). New Statutes were adopted by the International Commission on Acoustics in Antwerp 1996 March 31 and were approved by the IUPAP General Assembly in Uppsala Sweden 1996 September 20. An information letter explaining the proposed changes to the status of the commission was circulated to acoustical societies 1996 May 10. The new ICA held its first General Assembly 1998 June 25 during the 16th Congress in Seattle where the By-laws of the new organization were adopted by the Member Societies. The Commission then became known as the International Commission for Acoustics. The ICA has also applied to become an Affiliated Commission of the International Union of Theoretical and Applied Mechanics (IUTAM). A motion in favor of Affiliation was carried unanimously at the IUTAM General Assembly Meeting held at the University of Stuttgart 1998 August 28–30. The ICA became a Scientific Associate of the International Council of Scientific Unions ICSU in 2006.

The International Congress on Acoustics 
The International Congress on Acoustics is organized every three years by the International Commission for Acoustics. It is the world's biggest congress in the field of acoustics.

Dates and locations of past congresses of the International Commission for Acoustics:

 1st ICA	1953	Delft, Netherlands
 2nd ICA	1956	Cambridge, USA
 3rd ICA	1959	Stuttgart, Germany
 4th ICA	1962	Copenhagen, Denmark
 5th ICA	1965	Liège, Belgium
 6th ICA	1968	Tokyo, Japan
 7th ICA	1971	Budapest, Hungary
 8th ICA	1974	London, United Kingdom
 9th ICA	1977	Madrid, Spain
 10th ICA	1980	Sydney, Australia
 11th ICA	1983	Paris, France
 12th ICA	1986	Toronto, Canada
 13th ICA	1989	Belgrade, Yugoslavia
 14th ICA	1992	Beijing, China
 15th ICA	1995	Trondheim, Norway
 16th ICA	1998	Seattle, USA
 17th ICA	2001	Rome, Italy
 18th ICA	2004	Kyoto, Japan
 19th ICA	2007	Madrid, Spain
 20th ICA	2010	Sydney, Australia
 21st ICA	2013  Montreal, Canada
 22nd ICA	2016 Buenos Aires, Argentine
 23rd ICA	2019 Aachen, Germany

The ICA Early Career Award 

The ICA Award, officially known as International Commission for Acoustics Early Career Award, or ICA Early Career Award, is a prize awarded at the Triennial International Congress on Acoustics (ICA) to an individual who is relatively early in his/her professional career, and who has been active in the affairs of Acoustics and has contributed substantially, through outstanding published papers, to the advancement of theoretical or applied acoustics or both. The award can be withheld if candidates do not meet the requirements of excellence but is normally awarded to one or more scientists in the same year. The Award consists of a Certificate with citation, an engraved Medal, and a Cash Prize. The prestige is comparable to that of the Fields Medal for Mathematics.

There exist  other awards, German Acoustical Society Awards, Institute of Acoustics Society Awards and Acoustical Society of America Awards in acoustics which are usually focussing either on scientists from one country or in one particular field in acoustics or on members of one acoustical organization only and which are normally intended as lifetime achievement awards and/or awards for service to a particular society.

List of past recipients:

 2016 Frank A. Russo, Ryerson University (now Toronto Metropolitan University), Canadian citizen
 2013 Tapio Lokki, Aalto University School of Science, Finish citizen
 2010 Torsten Dau, Technical University of Denmark, German citizen
 2007 Nico F. Declercq, Georgia Institute of Technology, Belgian citizen
 2004 Timothy Leighton, University of Southampton, UK citizen
 2004 Oleg Sapozhnikov, Moscow State University, Russian citizen

References

External links 
 Official website

Members of the International Council for Science
Acoustics
International scientific organizations
Members of the International Science Council